Gladys Nyirongo is a Zambian politician. She is a former sports minister, and headed the Ministry of Lands. Nyirongo was a member of Heritage Party in Zambia and won the 2001 elections. She voted for the Speaker in favour of the ruling Levy Mwanawasa from the Movement for Multi-Party Democracy (MMD) and was expelled from the party, but was made the Sports Minister in 2002.

She won the 2006 elections in MMD ticket and was appointed the Minister of Lands until president Levy Mwanawasa sacked her in March 2007 under accusations that she handed out land plots to her family. A magistrate court sentenced her to four years of imprisonment in 2009, which was reduced in 2010 to two years following her appeal in High Court. She joined the ruling Patriotic Front in June 2016.

Early career
Nyirongo was a member of Heritage Party in Zambia. During the 2001 elections, Levy Mwanawasa from the Movement for Multi-Party Democracy (MMD) was elected as the President. He had a bigger opposition as all the opposing parties had 81 of the total 150 elected members. The President's nomination of six members would not be sufficient for seeking a majority with his 69 seats. He felt that passing legislations would be a challenge with a stiff opposition. He conceded in his accounts that he engaged in schemes to coalesce some of the opposition party members to vote for his candidate as the Speaker of the house. Nyirongo was one of the four opposition party members who voted for him and was expelled from her party. She was appointed the Sports Minister in 2002. She won the candidacy from MMD during the following election in 2006 and went on to become a Lands minister. She won from the Bwacha constituency in Central Province, claiming 51.4 per cent of the total votes polled. On 9 October 2006, she was appointed as the Lands Minister in the cabinet of Levy Mwanawasa with Moses Muteteka as her deputy.

As a minister
Nyirongo was the Lands minister in 2006–07 in the cabinet of Levy Mwanawasa, the third President and candidate of Movement for Multi-Party Democracy. He suspended her along with Commissioner of Lands Frighon Sichone.  She was suspended on 1 March 2007 following corruption scandal in land allocation involving senior officials. The suspension was effected to allow independent investigation of the Drug and Enforcement Commission. The report from the Zambia State House noted that Rv. Nyirongo allocated land to herself, her husband, son Walinase Nyirongo and daughter. The note also stated that she illegally allocated 25,000 hectares of land in Mpika to a foreigner against provisions that require approval from the President. Ms. Mukkuka Zimba, the permanent secretary of the ministry was also suspended for her alleged involvement in illegal land deals.

Corruption charges, sentence and aftermath
Nyirongo was charged under Section 99(1) of the Penal Code Chapter 87 of Laws of Zambia for abusing her office as a minister by misappropriating land procedures in two counts. In the first count, she was accused of directing Daisy Mulenga Msoka in some date in 2006 and 2007, an officer in her ministry to issue offer letters to selected individuals, namely Walinase Nyirongo, Janet Isaac Nyirongo, Peter Kapolyo, Peter Ngulube, Precious Ndhlovu, Doris Mulenga Mubanga Nuyunji, Mickey Mukubu, Mwelwa Kamfwa, Bruce Chipasha and Dingwall Hayden in Foxdale. The second count of accusation detailed her order to a junior technical officer in Ministry of Agriculture and Co-operatives to subdivide Zambia Consolidate Coppermine to be allocated to herself. On 13 January 2009, The Magistrate court ruled that she was convicted and sentenced her to four years imprisonment with the first two years with hard labour. She appealed against her sentence in High Court, which upheld the judgment of the lower court, but reduced he sentence to two years. The sentence was pronounced on 7 October 2010 and the court informed that the sentence was reduced to preserve her parliamentary position.

She joined the ruling Patriotic Front in June 2016. She was on campaign trail for the ruling party for the upcoming elections.

References

1958 births
Living people
Sport, Youth and Child Development ministers of Zambia
Women government ministers of Zambia
21st-century Zambian women politicians
21st-century Zambian politicians
Patriotic Front (Zambia) politicians
Movement for Multi-Party Democracy politicians
Heritage Party (Zambia) politicians
Members of the National Assembly of Zambia